Superman is a 1988 arcade action game released by Taito and featuring the DC Comics character Superman. While not directly based on the original film series, throughout much of the game the "Superman Main Theme" and "Can You Read My Mind" from the Superman films are used as background music.

In the game, the player assumes the role of Superman, who must fight through five levels to make the world safe from the evil Emperor Zaas, a character exclusive to this game. The game can be played by up to two players simultaneously, with the second player taking control of another Superman with a different colored costume.

Gameplay 

The player takes control of Superman, who must fight through five levels to make the world safe from the evil Emperor Zaas, a villain similar to Brainiac. The first player takes control of the traditional blue Superman, while the second player takes control of a red Superman with a grey cape.  The title starts out in Metropolis before going to San Francisco, Las Vegas and Washington, D.C.  Superman is able to punch, kick and fly. He can also use a projectile "Sonic Blast" attack when the player holds down then releases the punch button. There are also objects in the levels he can throw and/or break. Some of these objects release blue crystals that can restore Superman's energy, yellow crystals that allow the player to throw one projectile attack without charging or red crystals in flying stages that defeat all the enemies on the screen.  The first four levels have three-parts - a side-scrolling part, followed by a vertically scrolling flying part and a final side-scrolling shooter part where Superman uses heat vision instead of kicking and can destroy or dodge obstacles such as rocks. Each part has a boss at the end. The final level, the main boss' spaceship, adds a side-scrolling shooting section to the beginning and an extra final boss fight at the end.

Second player
The second player's Superman is identical to the first player's blue Superman, except for the color scheme. Whereas the first player controls Superman in his traditional color scheme (blue tights with a red cape, trunks and boots), the second Superman wears red tights with grey cape, trunks and boots. The presence of this alternate Superman is never explained in the game and is only intended as a co-operative gameplay mechanic.

Reception 
In Japan, Game Machine listed Superman on their March 15, 1989 issue as being the fifth most-successful table arcade unit of the month. Superman for the arcade was met with mixed reception from reviewers since its release. Computer and Video Games gave the game a positive outlook. Your Sinclairs Ciarán Brennan gave the title an overall negative outlook. ACE gave it a mixed outlook. The Games Machines Robin Hogg also gave it an overall mixed outlook. AllGames Brad Cook gave it a two out of five stars rating.

References

External links 
 Superman at GameFAQs
 Superman at Killer List of Videogames
 Superman at MobyGames

1988 video games
Arcade video games
Arcade-only video games
Cooperative video games
Multiplayer and single-player video games
Superhero video games
Superman video games
Taito arcade games
Video games developed in Japan
Video games scored by Masahiko Takaki
Video games set in San Francisco
Video games set in the Las Vegas Valley
Video games set in the United States
Video games set in Washington, D.C.